Einar Råberg (26 July 1890 – 2 January 1957) was a Swedish fencer and wrestler. As a fencer, he competed in the individual épée event at the 1920 Summer Olympics.

After his active career as an athlete, his organizational skills made him chairman in a variety of Swedish and international sports federations. Being especially fond of wrestling, he was elected the first president of the Swedish Wrestling Federation 1920 and also the first president of the International Amateur Wrestling Federation (IAWF), which was later renamed International Federation of Associated Wrestling Styles, after its creation in Lausanne 1921. After resigning from the position 1924, he later continued as vice president of the same organization 1930 to 1948. He was a member of the Swedish Olympic Committee (SOK) 1924 to 1948 and chairman of the Swedish Sports Confederation 1939 to 1951.

Einar Råberg represented Sweden as flag bearer in the opening ceremony of the 1924 Summer Olympics and as "Chef de Mission" in the 1948 Winter Olympics.

References

External links

1890 births
1957 deaths
Swedish male épée fencers
Olympic fencers of Sweden
Fencers at the 1920 Summer Olympics
People from Kalmar
Sportspeople from Kalmar County